The  Bihar Board of Open Schooling and Examination is the board of education for open education, which is administered by the government of Bihar.

References 

Government Departments of Bihar